Hussein Amin Bicar (2 January 1913 in Alexandria – 16 November 2002) was one of Egypt's most prominent artists of the 20th century. After graduating from the Cairo's School of Fine Arts in 1934, he spent more than 60 years of his life teaching art at schools and universities and then through the press. Bicar is credited for initiating a style of journalistic art that elevated illustrating for newspapers to a level close to that of the fine art and is known for his simple and clear style reflecting the influence of Pharaonic art with its harmony, serenity and mysticism.
Bicar's journalistic contributions go beyond illustrations to include art criticism and narrative poetry.
Being the first Egyptian artist to illustrate Arabic children's books, Bicar has played a major role in establishing and promoting this field.

Furthermore, his portraits and oil paintings depicting graceful Egyptian peasants, Nubian scenes, his native Alexandria and Egyptian Pharaonic themes as well as his elegant, gracious nature has earned him great recognition and honors.
In the words of late journalist Mustafa Amin:"he is not a single artist, he is a master of several arts…he is a painter, photographer, poet, musician and philosopher".

Early life
Hussein Amin Ibrahim Bicar was born on January 2, 1913, near Anfoushi to an Egyptian family of distant Cypriot descent, he was also a follower of the Baháʼí Faith in Egypt.
 From the time of his childhood in Alexandria, Bicar seemed destined to be an artist. He could play the lute at the age of eight and by nine, he was in demand as a music teacher for society ladies who due to cultural restrictions could not use adult male teachers.

Bicar's father died when he was young. His mother, who always encouraged his talents, moved him to Cairo when he entered the Higher School of Fine Arts at age fifteen. This school on Khallat Street in Shoubra was founded privately in the early 1900s. All teachers were European and students were obliged to follow a curriculum based in Western art. One of his teachers Friedman Cluezel from Sweden was especially important to Bicar's artistic development. He recognized Bicar to be “gifted as a portrait artist”. To express his confidence, Cluezel asked the young student to draw his portrait—one of the first of many that Bicar produced over the years.
In 1928 the Higher School of Fine Arts was brought under the auspices of the Ministry of Education, and Egyptian artists who had studied in Europe began to be hired as assistants and later as teachers. These teachers brought a new spirit into the school as they promoted sensitivity for Egyptian heritage. Among them was the great sculptor, Mahmoud Mokhtar. In his senior year, Bicar was able to study with the best portrait artist in Egypt at that time, Ahmed Sabri, who became his mentor and lifelong friend.

Graduating at the top of his class in 1933, the bright young Bicar had dreams of a brilliant future as a freelance artist, but the economic depression of the 1930s introduced a harsh reality. Bicar did manage, however, to earn a living during these difficult times and, paradoxically, to develop a versatility that served him well throughout his career.

Teaching career
Even from a very early age Bicar taught art to others, in Alexandria when he was just ten years old, he was a music teacher for society ladies who due to cultural restrictions could not use adult male teachers. One of his first jobs was a painter of folkloric scenes in the Helwan wax museum on Ibrahim Street. He also found work as a teacher in elementary and secondary schools and, in 1939, was selected as a member of a team of teachers who went to Morocco to teach at the invitation of the Moroccan government. During the next four years in Morocco, he learned to speak Spanish fluently. He also traveled extensively, taking advantage of his proximity to Europe. Bicar was visiting Berlin when World War II was declared. His job in Morocco ended and the Mediterranean was closed to travelers. To return to Egypt, he was forced to go by way of the Cape around South Africa. He spent three months during this journey painting portraits in Mozambique, then a Portuguese colony and the only neutral country on his route.

In 1943, after his return to Egypt, he was appointed assistant to his former professor, Ahmed Sabri, Bicar spent the next 17 years there where he went on to become the chair of the painting department where he taught the majority of a generation of contemporary Egyptian artists. His inclination to draw on Egyptian heritage for subject was inspirational for many of these students.

The illustrator and story writer

During the years in which he taught at The Faculty of Fine Arts as an assistant to his former professor Ahmed Sabri, his talent for illustrating began to be recognized, He was asked to prepare drawings for the first illustrated book to be published in Egypt, "The Stream of Days" by the eminent author Taha Hussein.
With this book, Bicar discovered a new outlet for his artistic creativity. He began to write himself and to illustrate his writings. His delightful depictions, clear and simple but rich in expression, graced numerous children's books over the years. Begun in 1952, it was also the first of its kind in Egypt.

As an illustrator, Bicar emphasizes that one should not be limited to a single artistic style. The artist should respond to the subject matter and allow it to suggest an appropriate style. Thus, the artist “gives himself to the subject.” Bicar counts among his friends the famous American illustrator, Norman Rockwell, who “made me proud to be an illustrator.”

Travels, journalism and poetry
Aside from primarily teaching for 17 years, Bicar also did some illustration work for the newspaper, Akhbar El Yom. In 1959, its founders and owners, Ali and Mustafa Amin, asked him to work full-time. He was to fill a unique position, that of a foreign correspondent who produced illustrated reportage for world circulation. He left the Faculty of Arts and began this adventurous assignment which took him to Ethiopia, Syria, Algeria, Morocco, Tunisia and Spain. These travels were curtailed when the newspaper was nationalized in 1962. That position was terminated but Bicar continued to write regular columns as an art critic for Akhbar El Yom and also write and illustrate a series of four–line verses called “The Rubaiyat”.

Artistry

Bicar believed that the challenge to hitherto artists was to syncretize by being local and international at the same time. He felt that a successful artist acknowledges the interdependence of all societies and cultures yet does not ignore the cultural foundation which gives fundamental meaning to life. Bicar believes that modern art has lost its way by resorting to shape without content. His art has a message. He aspires not “to imitate trite shapes” but to find the spirit that can inspire the artist. He defers to Mahmoud Mokhtar who was the first to insist that modern Egyptian art must come from Egyptian roots but should not imitate traditional art.

As a painter, Bicar's work is characterized by pure and simple lines which convey elements of forcefulness and spirituality. His versatility appears again and again as he works in a variety of media including water color, tempera, and oils—but the result is a distinctive Bicar style.

His subject matter is Egyptian. Unlike classical Greek or Roman art, which may be described as basically physical, the essence of Egyptian art is spiritual. The stylized figures in his paintings carry a poetic message representing the stability, nobility, and strength to be found in the character of Egypt's agrarian roots. His sparse, minimalistic lines often impose a sculptured quality on his figures in their austere settings.

This philosophical orientation towards expressing the spirituality of subjects is also apparent in Bicar's portraits. His subjects seem to glow and exude their personalities. Since his college days, Bicar has continued to be an outstanding portrait artist.

A gentle, modest, and extremely gifted man, Hussein Bicar's contribution to the arts of Egypt is beyond measure. After more than half a century as an artist and critic, he continued to be eclectic in his tastes, receptive to change, and eager to understand all schools of art as they reflect world conditions. Elegant in his simplicity, Bicar explained, “To understand is to appreciate”.

Abu Simbel Salvage and "The Eighth Wonder" Film

Amongst the most magnificent works of Bicar is the set of paintings done for "The Eighth Wonder", a documentary narrating the tale of Ramses II Temple in Abu Simbel in southern Egypt. While the construction of The Aswan Dam, begun in 1960, to stabilize the water supply of Egypt, the flooding which would result threatened the existence of irreplaceable ancient temples. Such temples are a unique legacy, not only to Egypt but to humanity as a whole. Thus, many countries came forward to participate in the rescue of these monuments under the umbrella of the UNESCO. In a remarkable feat of the 20th-century technology, Abu Simbel, one of the most valuable of Egypt's monuments, was moved to a higher location.

During the transfer of Abu Simbel, the idea developed of making a film to document the history of the temple from its construction to the present, the movie called “The Eighth Wonder” was a product of efforts of former Minister of Culture Dr.Sarwat Okasha. Dr. Okasha asked John Feeney from Canada to direct this production. Dr. Shehata Adam prepared the historical material. The film was produced under the supervision of the Director of the Center for Documentary Film, Hassan Fouad.

Bicar was asked to depict in paintings the early stages of constructing the temple. This included the opening ceremony for Abu Simbel—a ceremony attended by Ramses II and his lovely wife, Nefertari—“the prettiest of the pretty.” Ramses II had built several temples including one for Nefertari constructed next to one of his own.

Bicar drew illustrations depending on historical and geometrical information provided on this grand architectural structure. It took him more than two years to complete those works during which he visited Nubia and Thebes, Egypt. Bicar's paintings commissioned for the film, demonstrate mastery of his art and craft. Like the ancient Egyptian architecture, Bicar shows brilliance and precision. It is a great work of creativity. By drawing on imagination and consulting books of history, he has breathed life back into a full era of ancient history.

The commentary of the film was in English and Arabic and was produced in cinema laboratories in Rome for showing in movie theaters in Egypt and in Egyptian cultural centers abroad. It was shown in the Berlin festival for documentary films in 1973.
A copy of the film was dedicated by director John Feeney to The New Zealand Film Archive.

Visitors of Kafr El Gouna, near the red sea city town of Hurghada can now visit the Abu Simbel Museum by Bicar. On display are 54 of the paintings he created for the documentary, which showcase his consummate skill in historical illustrations and his passion for the Pharaonic civilization.

The musician

Bicar was an avid music lover, he could play the lute at the age of eight and by nine was teaching it to young girls and woman society. He never learned how to read notations even with the help of tutor and claimed unfortunately, I did not go beyond the ear, I listen to music but I could never read the note.

Bicar was a major figure in the art of scene of Cairo for more than 50 years. As a musician, poet, painter, teacher, illustrator, reporter and storywriter, Bicar has given and continues to give great pleasure to millions of people. His contribution to the arts is beyond measure.
Elegantly simplistic, eclectic and receptive to change, Bicar explains that "to understand is to appreciate" the fine lines of his cartoons stirred countless imaginations while the vibrant colors of his magnificent paintings gave voice to a million unuttered words.

Baháʼí life
In the 1980s, the Egyptian government arrested a number of Baháʼís, including Bicar, who was one of the high-profile leaders of the community. The Baháʼís were accused of trying to share teachings of the religion, which was banned in Egypt in the 1960s. Labib Moawad, one of Egypt's leading lawyers, defended Bicar and the other Baháʼís, and eventually all charges against Bicar were dropped due to his old age. Bicar presented Moawad with a painting as a tribute for his efforts during the trial.  After the trial, Bicar received the Mubarak award for the arts, and his public status was rehabilitated.

Awards
Over the years, Bicar received  a number of awards and decorations, among them are the following:
 Medal of pride from government of Morocco, 1942
 Patent of appreciation from Minister of Culture in Syria, 1961
 First class Medal of Science and art, 1967
 Honorary Award of Biennale of Alexandria, 1970
 Certificate of Honor from Art Academy, 1972
 Gamal Abdel Nasser Award with participation of the Soviet Union, 1975
 The State Merit Award in 1978
 National Certificate of Appreciation and Medal of Honor, 1980
 And most recently, the Mubarak prize (Egypt 2000) shortly before his death

Tribute
On January 2, 2017, Google Doodle commemorated Hussein Amin Bicar's 104th birthday.

Notes

References
 Sobhy EL Sharouny (2002). BIKAR. Dar el Shorouk. .
 A publication about Hussein Bicar published by the American University in Cairo in 1989, written by Betty Wass El-Wakil
 Inas Elhindy (2009). Bicar...Recitals In Painting''. published by the Supreme Council of Culture in Egypt.

External links 
 On Bicar's portraits in Al-Ahram Weekly newspaper dated 26 Aug.-1 Sep. 1999, author=Nagwa El-Ashri
 Mubarak Award
 On Baha'i Painters: Hussein Bikar and the Treatment of Baha'is in Egypt

1913 births
2002 deaths
Egyptian people of Turkish Cypriot descent
People from Alexandria
20th-century Egyptian painters
Egyptian Bahá'ís
Egyptian nationalists
Egyptian people of Cypriot descent
20th-century Bahá'ís
21st-century Bahá'ís
Abu Simbel